The Central District of Abumusa County is a district (bakhsh) in Abumusa County, Hormozgan Province, Iran. At the 2006 census, its population was 1,705, in 456 families.  The District has one city: Abu Musa.

Four Islands, Abu Musa, Sirri Island, and Great and Little Faror Island make up the district. All belong only to Iran.

References 

Districts of Hormozgan Province
Abumusa County